A Haitian patty is a baked puff pastry-type pastry. It is commonly filled with Beef, Fish or Chicken.

See also

 Cuban pastry
 Pasteles
 Empanadilla
 Jamaican patty

References

Haitian cuisine
Pastries